Coal Hill is an extinct town in Muskingum County, in the U.S. state of Ohio. The GNIS classifies it as a populated place.

History
A post office called Coal Hill was established in 1874, and remained in operation until 1895. Besides the post office, Coal Hill had a country store.

References

Unincorporated communities in Muskingum County, Ohio
1874 establishments in Ohio
Populated places established in 1874
Unincorporated communities in Ohio